The Federal Polytechnic, Ile-Oluji is a Federal government owned higher education institution located in Ile Oluji/Okeigbo, Ondo State, Nigeria. The current rector is Professor Emmanuel Adedayo Fasakin.

History 
The Federal Polytechnic, Ile-Oluji was established in 2014.

Courses 
The institution offers the following courses;

 Business Administration & Management
 Computer Engineering
 Science Laboratory Technology
 Civil Engineering Technology
 Computer Science
 Accountancy
 Cooperative Economics And Management
 Statistics
 Agricultural Technology
 Architectural Technology
 Fisheries Technology
 Electrical/Electronic Engineering Technology

References 

Federal polytechnics in Nigeria
2014 establishments in Nigeria